Private John Smith  was an English recipient of the Victoria Cross, the highest and most prestigious award for gallantry in the face of the enemy that can be awarded to British and Commonwealth forces.

He was born in London 1822 and enlisted in the 1st Madras European Fusiliers in 1841. He was awarded the Victoria Cross for action on 16 November 1857 at the Siege of Lucknow. His citation read:

Smith was discharged on pension in 1861 and died on 6 May 1866 at Tanjore, India.

References

 Chris Kempton Valour and Gallantry: H.E.I.C.& Indian Army Victoria Crosses & George Crosses 1856- 1946

1822 births
1866 deaths
British recipients of the Victoria Cross
British East India Company Army soldiers
Indian Rebellion of 1857 recipients of the Victoria Cross
Military personnel from London
19th-century English people